Banking Ombudsman may refer to:

 Banking Ombudsman Scheme (India)
 Financial Ombudsman Service in the United Kingdom
 Financial Ombudsman Service (Australia)